Shawn Jones (born 1976 in Oklahoma City, Oklahoma), is an American singer-songwriter and the founding member of the indie rock group The Lovely Sparrows.

Life 
Jones began singing, songwriting and playing music at age 10. He studied at Oklahoma City University and graduated with a degree in Jazz Performance. in Oklahoma City. He currently lives in Austin, Texas.

Career 
Shawn Jones formed The Lovely Sparrows in 2005. 2006's EP Pulling Up Floors... began the transition into more avant-garde finger picked folk music and "was a brutally wrought pop gem" and "retains the ironic slant of his songwriting while deftly layering dense orchestral arrangements..." 2008's full length Bury the Cynics continued to expand on these ideas and explored larger, more developed instrumental arrangements. He has been said to have a "gift for wordplay", with lyrics described as "brainy...startling imagery."  
Jones has recorded, toured and played with several bands over the past ten years.

Discography
 2011 Tall Cedars of Lebanon (Abandoned Love Records)
 2008 Bury the Cynics (Abandoned Love Records)
 2006 Pulling Up Floors, Pouring on (New) Paint (Abandoned Love Records)
 2006 Take Your Hats Off You Godless Bastards 7″ (Self-Released available through Abandoned Love Records)

References

Sources and external links
The Lovely Sparrows official website
The Lovely Sparrows on Myspace
Year of the Dog Music Video Eric Power

American male singer-songwriters
American folk singers
Musicians from Austin, Texas
Living people
1976 births
Singer-songwriters from Texas
21st-century American singers
21st-century American male singers